The 1989 British Formula Three season was the 39th season of the British Formula Three Championship, starting at Thruxton on 27 March and concluding there on 15 October after 16 races.

The title battle was largely fought between two sportscar racing stars of the future - West Surrey Racing's Allan McNish and Bowman Racing's David Brabham, both driving Ralt chassis. The former was initially declared champion at the end of the season as a result of Brabham being disqualified from his second-place finish the ninth round of the season at Silverstone and being penalised a further 18 points due to an irregularity with his Volkswagen engine. However, Brabham's points was reinstated following a court hearing in early 1990, giving him the title by a margin of 10 points over McNish.

Other notable drivers in the field included future BTCC champions Rickard Rydell (who would contest the championship again two years later) and Alain Menu, and future Formula One stars Mika Häkkinen and Mika Salo, who would go on to be the title protagonists in 1990.

1989 proved a high-water mark for the series in terms of entry numbers, which regularly exceeded 40 cars. The result of this was the creation of qualifying heats at certain rounds in order to slim the field down prior to the main race. It was also the first year for the Neil Brown Engineering-tuned Mugen-Honda engine, used by McNish among others, which would power all but one British F3 champion from 1990 to 2006. Class B was won by Fernando Plata in a year-old VW-powered Ralt.

Race calendar and results

 These races were shortened due to accidents.

Championship Standings

Class A

Class B

References

1989 in British motorsport
British Formula Three Championship seasons